The  Athletic Nautical Club of Glyfada , or "ANOG" (Greek: Αθλητικός Ναυτικός Όμιλος Γλυφάδας, "ΑΝΟΓ") was founded by 20 local sportsmen in 1946 and is located in Glyfada, Athens.

The first name of the club was Athletic Club of Glyfada (AOG), (Αθλητικός Όμιλος Γλυφάδας) and the departments was basketball, volleyball, swimming, track and field and last water Polo. In 1956 was founded the club Nautical Athletic Club of Glyfada (NAOG), (Ναυτικός Αθλητικός Όμιλος Γλυφάδας). In 1967 AOG and NAOG merged and the club took the name Athletic Nautical Club of Glyfada (ANOG).

Departments 
Swimming, Men's water polo, Women's water polo, Sailing, Tennis. The basketball department of ANOG merged with Esperides BC in 2003.

Titles 
Women's water polo:
2 European championships: 2000, 2003
8 Greek championships: 1989, 1996, 1999, 2000, 2001, 2002, 2004, 2008
Men's water polo:
 4 Greek championships: 1986, 1987, 1989, 1990
 3 Greek cups: 1986, 1987, 1989
Women's basketball:
 2 Greek cups: 2002, 2003

European Honours

External links
Official website
Όταν η Γλυφάδα άνοιξε τον δρόμο www.sport24.gr 

Water polo clubs in Greece
Multi-sport clubs in Athens
Basketball teams in Athens
Glyfada